Henry Abraham Mitchell (18 January 1887 – 11 June 1947) was an English professional golfer. Mitchell had eight top-10 finishes out of 17 appearances in the Open Championship, his best performance being fourth in 1920. He was runner-up in the 1912 Amateur Championship and won the 1924 Miami Open.

Early life
Mitchell was born in East Grinstead, Sussex on 18 January 1887. He was the illegitimate son of Mary Mitchell. Mary married a Mark Seymour in 1890 and Abe was brought up by his grandparents, George and Sophia Mitchell. Mark and Mary had a son Mark, Abe's half-brother, who also became a successful professional golfer. Mitchell was a fine amateur, and played for England against the Scots in 1910 and won. He won the Golf Illustrated Gold Vase twice in 1910 and 1913, and played in two Open Championships before turning professional in late 1913, attached to Sonning Golf Club in Berkshire.

Golf career
Mitchell won many golf tournaments in Great Britain and toured the United States frequently, winning the 1924 Miami Open, and entered three U.S. Opens. He led at the halfway stage in the 1920 Open Championship before collapsing in the third round, when he shot 84 and finished four shots behind winner George Duncan, who had been 13 shots off the lead after two rounds. In a match held on 26 July 1921, Mitchell and George Duncan were paired in a foursomes match and won against Chick Evans and Charles Mayo at Edgewater Golf Club in Chicago, Illinois where Mayo was serving as the head professional.

The Open Championship
Mitchell had eight top-10 finishes out of 17 appearances in the Open Championship. In the 1920 Open Championship he had rounds of 74−73−84−76=307 and finished in fourth place. He was leading the tournament on 147 after the first 2 rounds of play, but a third round 84 knocked him out of contention.

The Amateur Championship
He was runner-up in the 1912 Amateur Championship, losing to John Ball on the second extra hole.

Ryder Cup
Mitchell was supposed to be the player-captain of Great Britain's first Ryder Cup team in 1927, but was unable to make the voyage to the United States due to appendicitis. He did play on the next three teams in 1929, 1931, and 1933. Mitchell possibly was Samuel Ryder's personal golf instructor from 1925 at Verulam Golf Club, St Albans. The figure on top of the Cup trophy is modeled after Mitchell.

Tooting Bec Cup
Mitchell had the lowest round at the 1933 Open Championship at St Andrews, carding a fine 68, and won the Tooting Bec Cup.

Personal life and death 

Mitchell married Dora Deag on 27 November 1920 in Tunbridge Wells. He died suddenly in St Albans, England at age 60.

Amateur wins

1910 Golf Illustrated Gold Vase
1913 Golf Illustrated Gold Vase

Professional wins

1919 St Andrews Tournament ("Victory Open") (joint winner with George Duncan), News of the World Match Play
1920 McVitie & Price Tournament (joint winner with James Braid) News of the World Match Play, Kent Professional Championship
1921 McVitie & Price Tournament, Glasgow Herald Tournament
1922 Glasgow Herald Tournament, Southern Open (United States, tie with Leo Diegel)
1924 Miami Open (United States)
1925 Daily Dispatch Northern Professional Championship, Evening Standard Tournament
1926 Evening Standard Target Tournament, Roehampton Invitation
1927 Roehampton Invitation, Daily Mail Tournament, Hertfordshire Open Championship
1928 Roehampton Invitation, Ryder Tournament (joint winner with Bill Davies)
1929 Leeds Cup, News of the World Match Play, Irish Open, Selsdon Park Tournament, Hertfordshire Open Championship
1932 Bristol Evening World Tournament, Hertfordshire Open Championship
1934 Dunlop-Southern Tournament, Addington Foursomes (with Rex Hartley), Hertfordshire Open Championship

Results in major championships

Note: Mitchell only played in The Open Championship, U.S. Open, and The Amateur Championship.

NT = No tournament
WD = withdrew
CUT = missed the half-way cut
R128, R64, R32, R16, QF, SF = Round in which player lost in match play
"T" indicates a tie for a place

Sources: U.S. Open, Open Championship, Amateur Championship – 1910, 1911, 1912, 1913

Team appearances
Amateur
England–Scotland Amateur Match (representing England): 1910 (winners), 1911, 1912

Professional
Great Britain vs USA (representing Great Britain): 1921 (winners), 1926 (winners)
Seniors vs Juniors (representing the Seniors): 1928 (winners)
Ryder Cup (representing Great Britain): 1929 (winners), 1931, 1933 (winners)
England–Scotland Professional Match (representing England): 1932 (winners), 1933 (winners), 1934 (winners)

References

English male golfers
Ryder Cup competitors for Europe
People from East Grinstead
Sportspeople from St Albans
1887 births
1947 deaths